(CBŚP), or the Central Investigation Bureau of Police, is a unit within Polish police tasked with dealing with organized crime.

CBŚP was created on 15 April 2000. It has been called "the Polish FBI".

Until 2014 it was a unit of the General Police Headquarters of Poland. In 2014, it has been reorganized as a more independent unit. Its director is appointed by the Ministry of Interior and Administration.

It has been directed by Polish general  since its June 2016, until January 2019, when he was succeeded by nadinspector .

References

National law enforcement agencies of Poland
2000 establishments in Poland
Polish intelligence agencies